KNSK (91.1 FM) is a radio station licensed to Fort Dodge, Iowa. The station is owned by Iowa State University. KNSK is an affiliate of Iowa Public Radio, and carries the network's "News and Information" and "Studio One" services.

See also Iowa Public Radio

External links
Iowa Public Radio

NSK
NPR member stations
Fort Dodge, Iowa
Radio stations established in 1981
1981 establishments in Iowa